This is a list of seasons by the Barako Bull Energy Boosters of the Philippine Basketball Association.

Three-conference era

Two-conference era
*one-game playoffs**team had twice-to-beat advantage

Three-conference era
*one-game playoffs**team had the twice-to-beat advantage

Cumulative records